The Balochistan Liberation Front (BLF) is a militant group operating in the Balochistan region of southwestern Asia. The group was founded by Jumma Khan in 1964 in Damascus, and played an important role in the 1968–1973 insurgency in Sistan and Baluchestan province of Iran and 1973–1977 insurgency in Balochistan province of Pakistan. However, the group's insurgency was defeated in both Pakistan and Iran and the status of the group became unknown until 2004. The group re-emerged in 2004 after Allah Nazar Baloch took command of the group in 2003. Since then the group has taken responsibility for attacks on civilians, journalists, government officials and military personnel.

History
The group was founded by Jumma Khan in 1964 in Damascus, Syria. Four years after its formation, the group took part in the Iranian Baloch revolt against the government of Iran. During this time, the Iraqi government publicly supported the BLF, providing them with weapons and operational support. However, after five years of fighting, the BLF and other Baloch militant groups were decimated by Iran. The militant groups negotiated an end to fighting with the government of Iran, and Iraq stopped openly supporting the BLF with arms. However, the government of Iraq still maintained relations with the group's leadership.

Following the end of the conflict with Iran, the BLF and other Baloch militant groups began an insurgency against the government of Pakistan from 1973 to 1977. Initially the Iraqi government covertly provided the BLF and other militant groups with arms and ammunition. The Indian journalist Avinash Paliwal states that during the 1970s, Junior level Indian intelligence officials were actively involved in operations in Balochistan. The officers stated that "we gave Baloch everything, too from money to guns, during the 1970s, everything". On 10 February 1973, the Pakistani government raided the Iraqi embassy in Islamabad and uncovered crates of small arms and ammunition that were allegedly being supplied to the BLF and other militant groups. In response, the Pakistani government launched military operations against the BLF, which pushed them out of Balochistan into Afghanistan by the end of 1974. The Republic of Afghanistan was a sanctuary for all anti-Pakistani militant groups and from 1975 to 1980, it was estimated that it provided BLF members based in Afghanistan with $875,000 annually. While in exile in Afghanistan, the Soviet Union also allegedly helped BLF to regroup, allowing it rejoin the 1973 to 1977 insurgency. The insurgency came to an end in November 1977 with the government of Pakistan emerging victorious. From 1977 to 2004, the status of the BLF was unknown. However, according to reports, the group didn't disband. The group re-emerged in 2004 after Allah Nazar Baloch took command in 2003.

In 2015, The Hindu newspaper reported that it was once again contacted by Baluch Liberation Front (BLF) to confirm its growing connections with India.

Attacks
The group is responsible  for attack on civilian, journalist, government officials and military personnel in Balochistan since it re-emerged in 2004. The group along with another terrorist group named Baloch Liberation Army has claimed responsibility for killing 27 Journalists out of the total 38 journalists killed in Balochistan province since 2007. Some other attacks for which group has claimed responsibility for are:

In August 2012, Reporters without borders announced that BBC’s Urdu service correspondent in Quetta Ayub Tareen has been threatened by the BLF for his perceived partisan reporting on the group's political activities.

On early 27 July 2013, gunmen attacked a coastguard checkpost in Suntsar, Gwadar District. The attack was carried out by 24 armed gunmen which resulted in death of seven coast guards and injured seven others. Two injured coast guards were also kidnapped by the militants. Baluch Liberation Front claimed responsibility for the attack on the coastguard checkpost. BLF also stated that two of their militants were also killed in the attack.

In 12 April 2015, 20 construction workers from Punjab and Sindh province were gunned down in Turbat by armed gunmen, which the BLF later claimed responsibility for. After the attack, the Home Minister of Balochistan, Sarfraz Bugti claimed that Indian intelligence agencies were involved in supporting the BLF in carrying out such attacks. BLF claimed that the workers were members of Frontier Works Organization, which is a body linked to the Pakistani Army.

On 16 November 2017, the bullet-riddled bodies of 15 migrants were discovered in the city of Turbat. Security officials state that while attempting to cross the border, the migrants were kidnapped by armed men who later killed them. The BLF later claimed responsibility for the murder of the 15 migrants. The mastermind of the attack, Younas Taukali, was killed by Pakistani security forces in November 2017. Younas Taukali was one of the top eight commanders of Baluch Liberation Front.

References

Organisations designated as terrorist by Pakistan
Baloch nationalist militant groups
Balochistan
Communist militant groups
Rebel groups in Pakistan
Rebel groups in Afghanistan